NonStop is a series of server computers introduced to market in 1976 by Tandem Computers Inc., beginning with the NonStop product line. It was followed by the Tandem Integrity NonStop line of lock-step fault tolerant computers, now defunct (not to be confused with the later and much different Hewlett-Packard Integrity product line extension). The original NonStop product line is currently offered by Hewlett Packard Enterprise since Hewlett-Packard Company's split in 2015. Because NonStop systems are based on an integrated hardware/software stack, Tandem and later HPE also developed the NonStop OS operating system for them. 

NonStop systems are, to an extent, self-healing. To circumvent single points of failure, they are equipped with almost all redundant components. When a mainline component fails, the system automatically falls back to the backup.

These systems are often used by banks, stock exchanges, payment applications, retail companies, energy and utility services, healthcare organizations, manufacturers, telecommunication providers, transportation and other enterprises requiring extremely high uptime.

History 
Originally introduced in 1976 by Tandem Computers Inc., the line was later owned by Compaq (from 1997), Hewlett-Packard Company (from 2003) and Hewlett Packard Enterprise (since 2015). In 2005, the HP Integrity "NonStop i" (or TNS/E) servers, based on Intel Itanium microprocessors, was introduced. In 2014, the first systems "NonStop X" (or TNS/X), based on Intel x86-64 processors, were introduced. Sales of the Itanium-based systems ended in July 2020.

Early NonStop applications had to be specifically coded for fault-tolerance. That requirement was removed in 1983 with the introduction of the Transaction Monitoring Facility (TMF), along with Pathway transaction management software and SCOBOL applications (or, later, NonStop Tuxedo transaction management software), which handles the various aspects of fault tolerance on the system level.

Software 
NonStop OS is a message-based operating system designed for fault tolerance. It works with process pairs and ensures that backup processes on redundant CPUs take over in case of a process or CPU failure. Data integrity is maintained during those takeovers; no transactions or data are lost or corrupted.

The operating system as a whole is branded NonStop OS and includes the Guardian layer, which is a low-level component of the operating system and the Open System Services (OSS) personality which runs atop this layer, which implements a Unix-like interface for other components of the OS to use.

The operating system and application are both designed to support the fault tolerant hardware. The operating system continually monitors the status of all components, switching control as necessary to maintain operations. There are also features designed into the software that allow programs to be written as continuously available programs. That is accomplished using a pair of processes where one process performs all the primary processing and the other serves as a "hot backup", receiving updates to data whenever the primary reaches a critical point in processing. Should the primary stop, the backup steps in to resume execution using the current transaction.

The systems support relational database management systems like NonStop SQL and hierarchical databases such as Enscribe.

Languages supported include Java, C, C++, COBOL, SCOBOL, Transaction Application Language (TAL), etc. It uses the scripting and job control language TACL.

Hardware 
The HPE Integrity NonStop computers are a line of fault-tolerant, message-based server computers based on the Intel Xeon processor platform, and optimized for transaction processing. Average availability levels of 99.999% have been observed. NonStop systems feature a massively parallel processing (MPP) architecture and provide linear scalability. Each CPU runs its own copy of the OS, and systems can be expanded up to over 4000 CPUs. This is a shared-nothing architecture — a "share nothing" arrangement also known as loosely coupled multiprocessing, and no "diminishing returns" occur as more processors are added (see Amdahl's law).

Due to the integrated hardware/software stack and a single system image for even the largest configurations, system management requirements for NonStop systems are rather low. In most deployments there is just a single production server, not a complex server farm.

Most customers also have a backup server in a remote location for disaster recovery. There are standard products to keep the data of the production and the backup server in sync, for example, HPE's Remote Database Facility (RDF), hence there is fast takeover and little to no data loss also in a disaster situation with the production server being disabled or destroyed.

HP also developed a data warehouse and business intelligence server line, HP Neoview, based on the NonStop line. It acted as a database server, providing NonStop OS and NonStop SQL, but lacked the transaction processing functionality of the original NonStop systems. The line was retired, and no longer marketed, as of January 24, 2011.

See also 
Reliability engineering
Tandem Advanced Command Language
List of Computer Hardware Manufacturers

References

Sources 
Siewiorek, Daniel P.; Swarz, Robert S. (1998). Reliable Computer Systems, A K Peters, Ltd., . pp. 586–625.
Horst, R.W. (February 1995). "TNet: a reliable system area network". IEEE Micro.
Horst, Robert W.; Harris, Richard L.; Jardine, Robert L. (1990). "Multiple instruction issue in the NonStop Cyclone processor". Proceedings of the 17th Annual International Symposium on Computer Architecture. pp. 216–226.
Bernick, D. (2005). "NonStop advanced architecture". Proceedings of the 2005 International Conference on Dependable Systems and Networks.
Kim, Won (March 1984). "Highly available systems for database applications". ACM Computing Surveys.

External links 
HPE NonStop

Computer architecture
Computer-related introductions in 1976
Fault-tolerant computer systems
HP servers
MIPS architecture